Polinosovo is a rural locality (a village) in Slednevskoye Rural Settlement, Alexandrovsky District, Vladimir Oblast, Russia. The population was 9 as of 2010. There is 1 street.

Geography 
Polinosovo is located 23 km west of Alexandrov (the district's administrative centre) by road. Fedyaykovo is the nearest rural locality.

References 

Rural localities in Alexandrovsky District, Vladimir Oblast